The Company You Keep is a 2012 American political thriller film produced, directed by and starring Robert Redford. The script was written by Lem Dobbs based on the 2003 novel of the same name by Neil Gordon. The film was produced by Nicolas Chartier (Voltage Pictures), Redford and Bill Holderman.

The story centers on recent widower and single father Jim Grant, a former Weather Underground anti-Vietnam War militant wanted for a bank robbery and murder. Grant has hidden from the FBI for over 30 years, as an attorney in Albany, New York. He becomes a fugitive when his true identity is exposed by Ben Shepard, an aggressive young reporter. Grant must find his ex-lover, Mimi, the one person who can clear his name, before the FBI catches him. Otherwise, he will lose everything, including his 11-year-old daughter Isabel. While Ben struggles with ethical issues as a journalist, Jim and his old friends from the Weather Underground must live with the consequences of their radical past.

After film festival screenings in September 2012, the film's first theatrical release was in Italy in December 2012. A U.S. limited release began in April 2013, followed by wider release later in the month and releases in various foreign markets through December 2013. The film received a mixed reception from the critics in the U.S. but a generally favorable one abroad. It grossed $5.1 million in the U.S. and Canada, with foreign sales reaching $14.5 million.

Plot
A recently widowed single father, Jim Grant (Robert Redford), is a former Weather Underground militant wanted for a 1980 Michigan bank robbery and the murder of the bank's security guard. He has been hiding from the FBI for over thirty years, establishing an identity as a defense attorney near Albany, New York. When Sharon Solarz (Susan Sarandon), another former Weather Underground member, is arrested on October 3, 2011, an ambitious young reporter, Ben Shepard (Shia LaBeouf), smells an opportunity to make a name for himself with a national story. His prickly editor, Ray Fuller (Stanley Tucci), assigns him to follow up. Ben's ex-girlfriend, Diana (Anna Kendrick), is an FBI agent, and he presses her for information about the case. She tells him to look up a Billy Cusimano (Stephen Root). Billy, an old hippie with a history of drug arrests who runs an organic grocery, is an old friend of Sharon Solarz and a former client of Jim's. Billy is disappointed that Jim doesn't want to take Sharon's case, and he conveys this information to Ben when Ben questions him.

Ben pursues Jim and tries to question him, but Jim is evasive. Spooked by the federal investigation, Jim takes his 11-year-old daughter Isabel (Jackie Evancho) on "a little trip", driving north at first to throw off his pursuers. Ben learns that Mimi Lurie (Julie Christie), an accomplice in the Michigan bank robbery, was last seen in Canada. A private investigator helps Ben find out that Jim had no Social Security number prior to 1979 and finds a copy of Jim Grant's California death certificate. Ben concludes that Jim is really Nick Sloan, another former Weatherman, and writes an article breaking this news, creating a sensation and accelerating the FBI's interest.

Meanwhile, Jim and Isabel arrive in New York City. They go sight-seeing and check into a fancy hotel. The manhunt for Jim/Nick is now national news. While Isabel is sleeping, Jim leaves the room key hidden in the hotel lobby, along with legal papers giving Jim/Nick's brother, Daniel Sloan (Chris Cooper), guardianship of Isabel. Daniel retrieves them, and Isabel. FBI agents, under the direction of Diana's boss Cornelius (Terrence Howard), have been tracking Daniel and follow him to the hotel. They nearly catch Jim there, but Jim creates a diversion and escapes; FBI agents spot Daniel leaving with Isabel and stop them. Sharon Solarz refuses to provide any information to the FBI, but she agrees to talk to Ben. She is unrepentant about her radical activism in the Weather Underground and reveals that Nick and Mimi had a love affair long ago. Ben also questions Daniel and writes a gratuitously unflattering piece about him, annoying Ben's boss.

Jim/Nick goes to Milwaukee to find Donal (Nick Nolte), his old best friend, who owns a lumber yard. Donal discourages him from looking for Mimi, but tells him to contact former SDS member, history professor Jed Lewis (Richard Jenkins). Jed disagreed with Nick over using violence, resenting the Weather Underground for endangering their nonviolent counterparts. He initially refuses to help Jim, but when he finds out that Jim has a young daughter, he uses his connections with their old radical friends to track down Mimi. At Big Sur, California, Mimi imports marijuana into the U.S. aboard a sailboat as part of an operation run by Mac McLeod (Sam Elliott), Mimi's boyfriend. Through Jed, Jim reaches Mac, who informs him that Mimi left to go "inland". Jim knows where she is going.

Ben begins to feel that Jim's actions make no sense for a guilty man. Defying his boss, he goes to Michigan to investigate the original crime. He meets with retired cop Henry Osborne (Brendan Gleeson), who was the first person to investigate the robbery. Osborne refuses to talk in front of his adopted daughter Rebecca (Brit Marling), and Ben senses that he is hiding something important. Ben does some research, finding that Osborne had strong connections to Mimi's family before the bank robbery. He learns of the Linder-Lurie company property on the Michigan upper peninsula near Ontario, Canada. Osborne acknowledges that if Mimi were to come forward with the information that Jim was not present at the robbery (although Jim's car was used during it), Jim would be cleared of all charges. Later, Ben flirts with Rebecca.

Jim meets Mimi in a secluded cabin on the Linder-Lurie property. She is still passionate about the goals of the Weathermen and unapologetic about her old actions, but Jim argues that life has changed. Jim asks Mimi to turn herself in and confirm his alibi, for the sake of his daughter Isabel. He doesn't want to leave Isabel behind and repeat the mistake that he and Mimi made 30 years earlier by giving up their own daughter. Mimi reveals that their daughter is a beautiful young woman living in Ann Arbor. Meanwhile, Ben realizes that Jim is searching for Mimi, and that Rebecca is their daughter. He advises Rebecca to speak to her father. The next morning, Mimi flees the cabin to sail to Canada just as Ben arrives to find Jim. Ben reveals that he knows the truth about Rebecca and Osborne; Jim says that Ben must decide whether or not to keep the secret. Jim leaves the cabin so that the FBI will chase him instead of Mimi. Cornelius catches Jim, and Rebecca soon learns of the circumstances of her adoption. Meanwhile, Mimi turns her boat around and returns to the U.S. to give herself up. The next day, Jim is freed from jail and reunites with Isabel. Ben decides not to expose Osborne's actions of 30 years before and to protect Rebecca's true identity.

Cast
 Robert Redford as Jim Grant/Nick Sloan, a former member of the Weather Underground and widowed father posing as an upstanding Albany lawyer
 Shia LaBeouf as Ben Shepard, a reporter
 Julie Christie as Mimi Lurie, a former member of the Weather Underground
 Susan Sarandon as Sharon Solarz, a former member of the Weather Underground
 Jackie Evancho as Isabel Grant, Jim's 11-year-old daughter, who is unaware of her father's past
 Brendan Gleeson as Henry Osborne, the officer who had first investigated the bank robbery for which Grant is wanted
 Brit Marling as Rebecca Osborne, Henry's adopted daughter
 Anna Kendrick as Diana, an FBI agent, who had dated Ben and leaks information to him
 Terrence Howard as Cornelius, the FBI agent leading the chase
 Richard Jenkins as Jed Lewis, a college professor with links to the former radicals
 Nick Nolte as Donal Fitzgerald, Jim's old best friend who owns a lumber business
 Chris Cooper as Daniel Sloan, Nick Sloan's brother
 Sam Elliott as Mac Mcleod, Mimi's boss in the marijuana trade
 Stephen Root as Billy Cusimano, who runs an organic grocery store in Albany
 Stanley Tucci as Ray Fuller, Ben's boss at the newspaper
 Keegan Connor Tracy as Jim Grant's secretary
 Dawn Chubai as News Reader #1
 Sophie Lui as News Reader #2

Production and distribution
Produced by Nicolas Chartier (Voltage Pictures), Redford and Bill Holderman, the movie filmed in Vancouver in autumn 2011.  The film's "moody ... contemporary" score is by Cliff Martinez, its editor is Mark Day, and cinematography is by Adriano Goldman. The first trailer for the movie was released on August 30, 2012.

The film premiered on September 6, 2012, at the 69th Venice International Film Festival and then played at the 2012 Toronto International Film Festival on September 9, 2012. Sony Pictures Classics distributed the movie in the United States, and StudioCanal acquired the United Kingdom distribution rights.

The Company You Keep was released in Italian theatres in December 2012, earning more than $4.8 million there. Its limited release in the U.S. began in New York and Los Angeles on April 5, 2013, after which it received wider North American release. European, Australasian, South American, Middle-Eastern and Asian releases continued from April to December 2013. The first run of the film concluded in the U.S. in July 2013.

The film grossed $5.1 million in the U.S. and Canada, with foreign box office sales reaching $14.5 million (excluding China), for a worldwide theatrical total of $19.6 million. The Company You Keep was released on DVD and Blu-ray on August 13, 2013.

Reception
In early reviews from the Venice Film Festival, Variety called the film an "unabashedly heartfelt but competent tribute to 1960s idealism ... in its stolid, old-fashioned way, it satisfies an appetite, especially among mature auds, for dialogue- and character-driven drama that gets into issues without getting too bogged down in verbiage. ... There is something undeniably compelling, perhaps even romantic, about America's '60s radicals and the compromises they did or didn't make". The Hollywood Reporter praised the cast, especially Sarandon and Marling, and termed the film "a tense yet admirably restrained thriller ... Adapted with clarity and intelligence ... and lent distinguishing heft by its roster of screen veterans, this gripping drama provides an absorbing reflection on the courage and cost of dissent. ... While it provides for some passing commentary on the journalistic process and the slow death of print media, making the ambitious reporter such a driving figure perhaps mutes the focus a little. ... The storytelling is nonetheless robust and thematically rich".

In its U.S. release, the film received mixed reviews. On Rotten Tomatoes the film has an approval rating of 54%, based on 123 reviews, with an average rating of 6.10/10. The site's critical consensus reads, "The Company You Keep is a (frustratingly) slow-burning thriller about very contemporary issues." Time magazine wrote: "With a welcome mixture of juice and grit, the movie dramatizes the lingering conundrums of young people in the time of the Vietnam morass. ... [The film] is streaked with melancholy: a disappointment that the second American Revolution never came. ... Nonetheless, this is a pulsating drama of a man who goes on an intricate, often interior journey to outrun his past." NPR's Linda Holmes called the story "undercooked" and thought that "it all seems to have been a lot of noise and running for nothing". Rex Reed wrote in The New York Observer that "From ... a dazzling display of perfect performances, to the complex emotional relationships that result in guilt by association, the disparate elements in The Company You Keep are robustly collated by the keen, well-crafted direction of a master filmmaker at the top of his form."

TCYK LLC file sharing claims 
In July 2015 TCYK LLC, a US-based company, obtained a court order requiring that Sky Broadband, a UK company, disclose customer information corresponding to IP addresses that it alleged had infringed its copyright to The Company You Keep by unlawfully downloading and sharing the film on the internet during 2013. TCYK LLC then sent letters to dozens of these customers accusing them of such sharing and demanding a response, threatening "adverse costs consequences" for a failure to respond. Sky suggested that its customers contact for assistance Citizens Advice, an organization critical of this practice, known as a "speculative invoicing claim". TCYK LLC later sent a follow-up letter to Sky customers offering to settle the claim for a proposed amount of money and other conditions. BBC News reported that the file could have been shared by someone using a customer's wi-fi signal.

Awards

See also
 The East, 2013 film about an activist group similar to the Weather Underground.

References

External links
 Official website
 
 The Company You Keep at MovieClips.com
 Official U.S. movie trailer (2013)
 
 Redford and cast interviewed about making the film (2013)
 "Arts Beat: Live Streaming: TimesTalks with Robert Redford and Shia LaBeouf, The New York Times, April 2, 2013.
 May 2012 interview with Robert Redford about the film including clips from the filming.
 Still photos from the film

2012 films
American political thriller films
2010s English-language films
Films directed by Robert Redford
Sony Pictures Classics films
Weather Underground
Films about terrorism
Films set in Albany, New York
Films set in New York City
Films set in Milwaukee
Films set in Michigan
Films shot in Vancouver
Films about journalists
Voltage Pictures films
Brightlight Pictures films
Films scored by Cliff Martinez
Films with screenplays by Lem Dobbs
2010s political thriller films
2010s American films